Ian Castles  (20 February 1935 – 2 August 2010) was Secretary of the Australian Government Department of Finance (1979–86), the Australian Statistician (1986–94), and a Visiting Fellow at the Asia Pacific School of Economics and Government at the Australian National University, Canberra.

Life and career
Castles was born in Kyneton, Victoria and educated at state schools in Sale, Wesley College, Melbourne and Melbourne University. in 1954, he joined the Australian Public Service in the archives division of the National Library of Australia, then located in Melbourne, and moved to Canberra in 1957. He joined the Treasury in 1958. He was appointed Secretary of the Department of Finance commencing from 2 January 1979. In 1986 he was appointed Australian Statistician.

Between 1995 and 2000, he was Executive Director and Vice President and of the Academy of the Social Sciences in Australia and he was also President of the International Association of Official Statistics.

He was a contributor to Online Opinion, appeared at events hosted by the Institute of Public Affairs and Centre for Independent Studies, and published papers with The Lavoisier Group. Ian Castles was known for his criticism of the Intergovernmental Panel on Climate Change, particularly its Special Report on Emissions Scenarios.

His interests included research into the information requirements for public policy (especially at the international level) and the history of economic thought.

Ian Castles died on 2 August 2010, aged 75. His death was in Canberra Hospital, from complications following a heart attack.

Honours
Ian Castles was appointed an Officer of the Order of the British Empire in June 1978, and an Officer of the Order of Australia in June 1987.

Publications
His publications include:
Ian Castles and David Henderson (2003) The IPCC emission scenarios: An economic-statistical critique, Energy & Environment, vol. 14: nos.2–3.
Ian Castles and David Henderson (2003) Economics, emissions scenarios and the work of the IPCC, Energy & Environment, vol. 14, no. 4.
Castles, Ian (2000) 'Reporting on Human Development: Lies, Damned Lies and Statistics', In Facts and Fancies of Human Development. Castles, Ian (eds.). Canberra: Academy of the Social Sciences in Australia.

References

External links
Ian Castles at Academy of the Social Sciences in Australia
Ian Castles at Online Opinion
Sourcewatch : Ian Castles

1935 births
2010 deaths
Australian statisticians
Australian Officers of the Order of the British Empire
Officers of the Order of Australia
Secretaries of the Australian Department of Finance
People from Kyneton